Chiloglottis triceratops, commonly known as the three-horned bird orchid, is a species of orchid endemic to Tasmania. It has two broad leaves and a greenish brown to purplish brown flower with a few column-like calli near the mid-line of the labellum.

Description
Flowering occurs from November to January.

Taxonomy and naming
Chiloglottis triceratops was first formally described in 1998 by David Jones and the description was published in Australian Orchid Research. The specific epithet (triceratops) refers to the similarity between the dinosaur Triceratops and the tall calli on the labellum of this orchid.

Distribution and habitat
The three-horned bird orchid is widespread and common in Tasmania, growing in shrubby and heathy forest, often in dense colonies.

References

External links 

triceratops
Orchids of Tasmania
Plants described in 1998